The President's House, known in Hebrew as Beit HaNassi ('בֵּית הַנָּשִׂיא) and Mishkan HaNassi (מִשְׁכָּן הַנָּשִׂיא), is the official residence of the President of Israel. It is located in the Talbiya neighborhood of Jerusalem.

Etymology
In Modern Hebrew, beit means house, mishkan residence, and nasi president, the last being derived from the Biblical Hebrew word for prince. ''Ha' is the Hebrew definite article.

History
Before Beit HaNassi was built, President Chaim Weizmann lived in Rehovot in his own villa. Yitzhak Ben-Zvi used a cabin in Rehavia for his presidential duties while living in a regular apartment.

In 1963, a plan to build a residence for the incoming president, Zalman Shazar, was started. During Shazar's presidency, he declined the offer to have the future residence built as part of existing political buildings. As a result, the construction of a house in Talbiya was approved, to be built on a ten-dunam plot. In 1964, architect Aba Elhanani won the contest for the residence design. Beit HaNassi was inaugurated in 1971 by President Shazar. The design came under harsh criticism from different public figures.

During the visit to Israel of Pope Benedict XVI in 2009, President Shimon Peres inaugurated a new custom that all visiting world leaders would plant an olive tree in the Beit HaNassi "peace garden".

In October 2017, work was completed on a new, enlarged entrance to Beit Hanassi to enable faster processing of visitors to major events at the residence.

Gallery

References

External links
Art at Beit HaNassi

Official residences in Israel
+
Presidential residences
Buildings and structures in Jerusalem
1971 establishments in Israel
Houses completed in 1971
Talbiya